Olya Fomina (born March 1, 1989 in Moscow, Russia) is a musician, singer, and songwriter. She is best known as the lead vocalist, pianist, and primary songwriter for the New York-based band Scarlet Sails.

While living in Russia, Olya studied classical piano, writing her first musical piece when she was 8 years old. Ten years later, she signed up for singing classes as her real dream was to be a singer. At 21, she travelled to New York City to begin learning English so she could write songs in English, and eventually moved permanently to NYC.

She met her husband, Brian Viglione, at Bowery Electric in June 2013 at a Black Flag tribute show. In March 2014, the two were married in New York City.

References 

1989 births
Living people
Russian singer-songwriters
Russian women singer-songwriters
Singers from New York City
Singers from Moscow
21st-century American singers
21st-century Russian singers
21st-century Russian women singers